Cheshmeh Gorgi (also Romanized as Cheshmeh Gorgī and Chashmeh Gorgi; also known as Chashmeh Gogird, Chashmeh Gorgīr, and Cheshmeh Gorgīr) is a village in Qaleh Tall Rural District, in the Central District of Bagh-e Malek County, Khuzestan Province, Iran. At the 2006 census, its population was 79, in 14 families.

References 

Populated places in Bagh-e Malek County